This is a list of television channels in Malta.

Terrestrial channels
TVM
TVMNews+
Parliament TV
NET Television
One
F Living
Smash Television
Xejk

Public channels
ITV Shopping (Available only on Melita 107, Go Bronze)

Private Melita Channels

Promotion Channel
Weather and Info Channel
Melita Sports 1
Melita Sports 2
Melita Sports 3
Melita Sports 4
Melita Sports 1 HD
Melita Sports 2 HD
Melita More
Melita More HD

Private GO Channels

GO Weather and Info Channel
GO Stars
GO Sports 1
GO Sports 2
GO Sports 3
GO Sports 4
GO Sports 5
GO Sports 6

Satellite/cable channels
There are two services available, cable provider Melita and digital terrestrial service Go.
Live Casino TV

Pan-European/International Channels
Euronews
Eurosport
Eurosport 2
CNBC Europe
BabyTV
BBC Entertainment
BBC World News
Boomerang (UK & Ireland)
Cartoon Network (UK & Ireland)
CNN International
CBS Reality
Discovery Channel Europe
TLC
Disney Channel (Europe, Middle East, and Africa)
E!
Food Network
ITV Choice
MGM Movie Channel
Movies4Men
MTV Dance
MTV Europe
National Geographic Channel (Maltese feed)
Nickelodeon
Sky News
Sony Entertainment Television
Sony Movie Channel
VH1 Classic Europe
VH1 Europe
Fox (Greek TV channel)

Religious channels
EWTN
God TV
Daystar (TV network)

Italian channels 
Rai 1
Rai 2
Rai 3
Rai 4 
Rai 5
Rai Yoyo
Rai Gulp
Rai News24
Rai Premium
Rai Vaticano
Italia 1
Rete 4
Canale 5
La7
TV2000
Boing
La7d
Mediaset

Television stations